Pastor Linares (born 1971-05-12) is a retired male professional road racing cyclist from Venezuela.

Career

1996
1st in General Classification Vuelta a Venezuela (VEN)
1997
1st in Stage 8 Vuelta al Táchira (VEN)

References
 
Venezuelan cyclists

1971 births
Living people
Venezuelan male cyclists
Vuelta a Venezuela stage winners
Place of birth missing (living people)
20th-century Venezuelan people